Metal God Essentials Vol. 1 is a compilation album released by American heavy metal band Halford in 2007. It was released as a standard CD with a bonus DVD, and also as a limited edition (5000 copies) Digipak including a bonus remix CD and Rob Halford's autograph.

Track listing

All bonus CD tracks are remixes of "Forgotten Generation".

Bonus DVD
 Resurrection – Behind the Scenes
 Live Insurrection – Behind the Scenes
 "Made in Hell" (music video)
 "Betrayal" (music video)
 "In the Morning" (music video)
 "Silent Screams" (Live at Rock in Rio III)
 "Never Satisfied" (Live in Anaheim)
 "Forgotten Generation" (music video)

Personnel
Halford (tracks 1–6, 9–12, 14 and 15)
Rob Halford – vocals
Metal Mike Chlasciak – guitar
Patrick Lachman – guitar
Roy Z – guitar
Ray Riendeau – bass
Mike Davis – bass (tracks 11–12)
Bobby Jarzombek – drums

Fight (tracks 7, 8 and 13)
Rob Halford – vocals
Brian Tilse – guitar
Russ Parrish – guitar
Jay Jay – bass
Scott Travis – drums

Production
Produced by Roy Z
Executive producer – John Baxter
Tracks 1–3 and 9–10 mixed by Charlie Bauerfiend and Roy Z
Tracks 4, 6, 11, 12, 14 and 15 mixed by Tue Madsen
Track 5 mixed by Bob Marlette and Rob Halford
Tracks 7, 8 and 13 mixed by Roy Z
Bonus CD remixes by Attie Bauw
Mastered by Tom Baker
Graphic direction, web marketing, and design by Attila Juhasz
Cover illustration and packaging design by Marc Sasso
Photography by John Eder, Neil Zlozower, Ross Halfin, Greg Kozak, John Baxter, and William Hames

Halford (band) albums
2007 compilation albums
2007 video albums
2007 remix albums
Music video compilation albums